Cycnoches ventricosum is a species of orchid native to southern Mexico, Belize and Central America.

References

ventricosum
Orchids of Belize
Orchids of Mexico
Orchids of Central America